Ivo Felix (born 4 December 1955) is a Czech ski jumper. He competed in the normal hill event at the 1976 Winter Olympics.

References

External links
 

1955 births
Living people
Czech male ski jumpers
Olympic ski jumpers of Czechoslovakia
Ski jumpers at the 1976 Winter Olympics
People from Jilemnice
Sportspeople from the Liberec Region